While We're Young may refer to:
While We're Young (film), a 2014 film directed by Noah Baumbach
While We Are Young, a 2017 Singaporean TV series
While We're Young (album), a 1993 album by John Abercrombie
While We're Young (song), a 1943 song, popularized by Don Cherry, Tony Bennett and other artists
 "While We're Young", a 2019 song by Huey Lewis and the News from the album Weather

See also
Live While We're Young, a song by One Direction